Sadov is a municipality and village in Karlovy Vary District in the Karlovy Vary Region of the Czech Republic. It has about 1,300 inhabitants.

Administrative parts
Villages of Bor, Lesov, Podlesí and Stráň are administrative parts of Sadov.

References

Villages in Karlovy Vary District